The 1986 Virginia Slims of Arizona singles was one of the events of the 1986 Virginia Slims of Arizona tennis tournament. It was played between March 23 and March 29, 1986, at the Jordan Tennis and Racquet Center in Phoenix, Arizona in the United States. The draw consisted of 32 players of which 4 were qualifiers and 8 were seeded. Unseeded Beth Herr won the singles title, defeating sixth-seeded Ann Henricksson in the final, 6–0, 3–6, 7–5.

Seeds

Draw

Finals

Top half

Bottom half

References

External links
 ITF tournament edition details
 Tournament draws

ASB Classic - Singles
Virginia Slims of Arizona